Shoot the Hero! is a 2010 American action-comedy film directed by Christian Sesma, starring Jason Mewes, Samantha Lockwood, Nick Nicotera, Mike Hatton and Danny Trejo.

Cast
 Jason Mewes as Nate
 Samantha Lockwood as Kate
 Nick Nicotera as Fat Smith
 Mike Hatton as Thin Smith
 Danny Trejo as Crazy Joe
 Nicholas Turturro as Grant
 Paul Sloan as Franklin
 Fred Williamson as The General
 Taylor Negron as Douglas
 Brian Drolet as Hayek
 Katie Morgan as Baby Doll
 Annemarie Pazmino as China Doll

Release
The film premiered at the Palm Springs International Film Festival on 8 January 2010.

Reception
Variety called the film "a little strange, a little amateurish and a bit fun". Tyler Forster of DVD Talk wrote that the film is "far from flawless, but it's not too bad either".

Doug Brunell of Film Threat wrote that "when you spend a majority of the time thinking to yourself that what you are seeing on screen would never happen, you can’t help but ultimately realize it is a lost opportunity … though a slightly guilty pleasure nonetheless."

References

External links
 
 

American action comedy films
2010 action comedy films